Arthur Bateman may refer to:

Arthur Bateman (cricketer) (1890–1918), Irish cricketer
Arthur Bateman (footballer, born 1908) (1908–1988), English footballer
Arthur Bateman (footballer, born 1918) (1918–1984), English footballer
Arthur Leonard Bateman (1879–1957), British Member of Parliament for Camberwell North, 1931–1935